La Razón is a daily newspaper based in Madrid, Spain. It has the sixth-highest circulation among general-interest Spanish dailies, and the fourth-highest among those based in Madrid.

The newspaper has satellite news bureaux, and local editions, in Barcelona, Murcia, Seville, Valencia and Valladolid.

History and stance
La Razón was founded in 1998 by Luis Maria Ansón. The paper is owned by Grupo Planeta and based in Madrid. The newspaper's editorial stances are primarily neoliberal economically and conservative socially. The paper has also a rightist stance.

Circulation
La Razón had a circulation of 140,000 copies in 2003. The 2008 circulation of the paper was 153,024 copies. It was 124,284 copies in 2009, 118,466 copies in 2010 and 103,789 copies in 2011. Between July 2010 and June 2011 the paper had a circulation of 109,166 copies.

Staff
Francisco Marhuenda is the editor of the daily. Leading contributors include Alfonso Ussía, César Vidal, Carmen Gurruchaga, and Carlos Rodríguez Braun.

Controversies
La Razón has been a focus of attention for the intentionally provocative design of the front pages, even appearing in other media and causing big debates on social networks.

The edition of 9 May 2012 caused great controversy in some sectors, and it was criticized by the Le Monde newspaper, having featured photos of five students with names and surnames and a text below describing them as "bad students" and "stirrers" to make a call for participation on a protest against the cutbacks on education. The student union decided to file a complaint against the newspaper.

In the aftermath of the November 2015 Paris attacks, the paper published a doctored image of Veerender Jubbal, a Canadian Sikh, falsely labelling him as “one of the terrorists”.

References

External links

1998 establishments in Spain
Conservatism in Spain
Daily newspapers published in Spain
Newspapers established in 1998
Newspapers published in Madrid
Planeta Group
Spanish-language newspapers
Spanish news websites